The 32nd Vehbi Emre & Hamit Kaplan Tournament 2014, was a wrestling event held in Istanbul, Turkey between February 1 and 2, 2014.

This international tournament includes competition men's Greco-Roman wrestling. This ranking tournament was held in honor of the Olympic Champion, Hamit Kaplan and Turkish Wrestler and manager Vehbi Emre.

Medal table

Greco-Roman

Participating nations

References 

Vehbi Emre and Hamit Kaplan
Vehbi Emre and Hamit Kaplan
Sports competitions in Istanbul
International wrestling competitions hosted by Turkey
Vehbi Emre & Hamit Kaplan Tournament